Kaapa is a 2022 Indian Malayalam-language action thriller film directed by Shaji Kailas and written by G. R. Indugopan based on his novel Shankhumukhi. Produced by Fefka Writers Union, Theatre of Dream and Saregama India Limited, it stars Prithviraj Sukumaran along with Asif Ali, Aparna Balamurali and Anna Ben.

Kaapa was released in theatres on 22 December 2022 and received mixed reviews from critics.

Plot 
Anand, an IT professional recently moves to Thiruvananthapuram from Bangalore with his pregnant wife Binu Thrivikraman. During a routine police check in their neighbourhood, Anand learns that his wife's name is being included in the "KAAPA" (Kerala Anti-Social Activities Prevention Act) list, a list that includes the names of all the local gangsters. Anand decides to clear Binu's name and sends her to his hometown to have a safe pregnancy.

Later, Anand meets Arun, a police constable to seek his help for removing Binu's name, and soon learns about her involvement in leading a gang and her rivalry with the city's leading gangster and upcoming politician Kotta Madhu, as Madhu was responsible for Binu's brother's death. Anand meets Kotta Madhu and manages to earn his trust in order to help Binu. Later, Anand learns that a reporter named Latheef has hired goons to finish Madhu and informs Prameela, who later informs Madhu. Madhu thrashes them and Latheef gets scared of getting caught by Madhu.

Anand travels to Binu's hometown and arranges their baby's naming ceremony. Latheef meets Anand and reveals about his rivalry with Madhu resulted in his cousin Nazeer getting exiled to UAE, where he tells Anand to form a truce between him and Madhu in order to live a peaceful life. Though relucant, Madhu agrees and arrives at the spot where the truce is held, but Madhu is killed in a bomb blast by a boy, whose life was severely damaged by Madhu as he bombed an assassin due to his orders and was sent to juvenile prison.

Anand pays his last respect to Madhu and leaves the premises, where he feels guilty about being used by Latheef. After Madhu's autopsy report, Prameela learns that Binu is wearing Madhu's ring; thus revealing that she was the mastermind behind Madhu's death and Latheef was her family-friend. Binu was also the faceless leader leading a gang and attempted to kill Madhu while Anand was busy to prove her innocence. Prameela calls Binu and swears that she will avenge Madhu's death, while Binu also promises to protect her family without Anand's knowledge.

Cast

Production

Development 
On 17 August 2022, Prithviraj Sukumaran announced that Mammootty and Mohanlal would be launching a project on 18 August, the next day. That day, 18 August, the motion poster was shared by them and the title was revealed to be Kaapa. The film was initiated by Fefka Writers Union. The title Kaapa is the short form of an act called Kerala Anti-social Activities (Prevention) Act. Venu was the director. But on May 2022, Venu opted out of the film as director due to creative differences between him and Fefka Writers Union. He was then replaced by Shaji Kailas. Cinematographer Sanu Varghese, editor Mahesh Narayanan and musician Justin Varghese were the initial technical crew of the film. They were later replaced by Jomon T. John, Shameer Muhammed and musicians Dawn Vincent and Jakes Bejoy respectively. The film was scripted by G. R. Indugopan based on his novel Shankhumukhi.

Casting 
The film was initially announced with the cast of Prithviraj Sukumaran, Asif Ali, Manju Warrier and Anna Ben. However, Manju Warrier left the film as she was busy with her schedules on shooting for Ajith Kumar's Thunivu (2023). Aparna Balamurali came as the replacement. Actors Dileesh Pothan, Jagadish Kumar and Nandhu were later revealed to be part of the cast.

Filming 

Filming was to begin on 20 May 2022 but was postponed due to Venu opting out of the film. Principal photography began on 15 July 2022 in VJT Hall, Palayam, Thiruvananthapuram. On 16 July, director Shaji Kailas sought permission from Chief Minister Pinarayi Vijayan for a day's shooting in the area around the Kerala Government Secretariat as the Government of Kerala had enforced a ban there for shooting. Sukumaran gave a 60 days date for the filming of Kaapa. An action scene with Sukumaran was shot on 26 July. Filming came to a conclusion on 16 September 2022.

Music 

Dawn Vincent and Jakes Bejoy composed the film's music. All recordings were done at Kochi. The first single titled "Yamam Veendum Vinnile" was released on 16 December 2022 while the second single, "Thiru Thiru Thiruvananthapurathu", was released on 19 December 2022.

Release

Theatrical 
Kaapa was released theatrically on 22 December 2022 during Christmas.

Home media 
Kaapa had its post-theatrical streaming on Netflix starting from 19 January 2023.

Reception 
Gopika I. S. of The Times of India gave 3.5 out of 5 and wrote "More or less, Shaji Kailas has succeeded in delivering a satisfying gangster movie." S. R. Praveen of The Hindu wrote "One sees glimmers of what the movie could have been in some of the well-conceived background stories, but director Shaji Kailas ends up giving it a predictable treatment." Anna M. M. Vetticad of Firstpost gave 1.75 out of 5  and wrote "Prithviraj Sukumaran and Shaji Kailas serve up a clichéd, bloody gangster drama in which women are not written as fully fleshed out characters but as mere plot devices."

Manoj Kumar R. of The Indian Express gave 2 out of 5 and wrote "Prithviraj's act as Madhu is hard to buy as he comes across as an indecisive and unwise criminal, despite being the head of a crime syndicate." Sowmya Rajendran of The News Minute gave 2 out of 5 and wrote "Shaji Kailas's Prithviraj starrer doesn't work as a mass-action film because it doesn't have enough originality." Latha Srinivasan of India Today gave 3 out of 5 and wrote that "Kaapa is one of the better films from Prithviraj this year, among the six releases he had. Those going to watch Kaapa for Shaji Kailas and Prithviraj must go with an open mind for a new experience."

References

External links 

2020s Malayalam-language films
2022 action thriller films
Indian action thriller films
Indian gangster films
Films based on Indian novels
Films shot in Thiruvananthapuram
Films directed by Shaji Kailas